The 2013 Division 1, part of the 2013 Swedish football season, was the 8th season of Sweden's third-tier football league in its current format. The 2013 fixtures were released in December 2012. The season started on 14 April 2013 and ended on 27 October 2013.

Teams
A total of 28 teams contested the league, divided into two division, Norra and Södra. 20 returning from the 2012 season, two relegated from Superettan and six promoted from Division 2. The champion of each division qualified directly for promotion to Superettan, the two runners-up had to play a play-off against the thirteenth and fourteenth team from Superettan to decide who would play in Superettan 2014. The bottom three teams in each division qualified directly for relegation to Division 2.

Stadia and locations

Norra

Södra

 1 Correct as of end of 2012 season

League tables

Norra

Södra

Positions by round

Norra

Södra

Results

Norra

Södra

Season statistics

Norra top scorers

Södra top scorers

See also
 2013 Allsvenskan
 2013 Superettan
 2012–13 Svenska Cupen
 2013 Svenska Supercupen

References

Swedish Football Division 1 seasons
3
Sweden
Sweden